Hans Anthon Beyer (23 August 1889 – 15 May 1965) was a Norwegian gymnast who competed in the 1912 Summer Olympics.

He was part of the Norwegian team, which won the gold medal in the gymnastics men's team, free system event. He was born in Bergen and died in Mo i Rana, and represented Bergens TF.

References

1889 births
1965 deaths
Norwegian male artistic gymnasts
Gymnasts at the 1912 Summer Olympics
Olympic gymnasts of Norway
Olympic gold medalists for Norway
Sportspeople from Bergen
Olympic medalists in gymnastics
Medalists at the 1912 Summer Olympics
20th-century Norwegian people